Laden Gamiet (born 23 January 1978) is a South African cricketer. He played in 54 first-class, 69 List A, and 12 Twenty20 matches from 1995 to 2008.

References

External links
 

1978 births
Living people
South African cricketers
Border cricketers
Northerns cricketers
Warriors cricketers
Cricketers from East London, Eastern Cape